François de La Rochefoucauld may refer to:

 François III de La Rochefoucauld (1521–1572), French courtier and soldier
 François de La Rochefoucauld (writer) (1613–1680), French author
 François de La Rochefoucauld (cardinal) (1558–1645), French cardinal of the Catholic Church
 François de La Rochefoucauld, marquis de Montendre (1672–1739), Field Marshal of the British Army
 François Alexandre Frédéric de La Rochefoucauld, Duke of La Rochefoucauld (1747–1827), French social reformer
 François, duc de La Rochefoucauld (1765–1848)

See also 
 Duc de La Rochefoucauld